Signe Riisalo (born 8 October 1968) is an Estonian politician.  she serves as Minister of Social Protection in the cabinet of Prime Minister Kaja Kallas. She is affiliated with the Reform Party.

References 

1968 births
21st-century Estonian politicians
21st-century Estonian women politicians
Estonian Reform Party politicians
Government ministers of Estonia
Living people
Members of the Riigikogu, 2023–2027
Politicians from Tallinn
Tallinn University alumni
University of Tartu alumni
Women government ministers of Estonia